DQN could refer to:

 Du Quoin station, Amtrak station code DQN
 Station code for Dhanera station, Gujarat, India - see List of railway stations in India
 Deep Q-Network, used in Deep Q-learning
 An internet slang used as derogatory name in Japan.